Schmaler Luzinis a lake in the Mecklenburgische Seenplatte district in Mecklenburg-Vorpommern, Germany. At an elevation of 84.3 m, its surface area is 1.29 km².

External links 
 

Lakes of Mecklenburg-Western Pomerania
Nature reserves in Mecklenburg-Western Pomerania